The Albert and Celestine Mabey House, at 10201 S. 1300 West in South Jordan, Utah, was listed on the National Register of Historic Places in 2013.

It is an Italianate and Victorian house built in 1898.

References

		
National Register of Historic Places in Salt Lake County, Utah
Houses completed in 1898